Panglima Estino, officially the Municipality of Panglima Estino (Tausūg: Kawman sin Panglima Estino), is a 5th class municipality in the province of Sulu, Philippines. According to the 2020 census, it has a population of 34,249 people.

History
On January 1, 1980, then President Ferdinand Marcos enacted Presidential Decree No. 1663 creating the municipality of New Panamao from the mother municipality of Panamao. However to avoid confusion from the mother municipality, on January 2, 1981, then President Marcos enacted Presidential Decree No. 1757 renaming New Panamao to its current name, Panglima Estino.

Geography

Barangays
Panglima Estino is politically subdivided into 12 barangays. 
 Gagguil
 Gata-gata
 Jinggan
 Kamih-Pungud
 Lihbug Kabaw
 Likbah
 Lubuk-lubuk
 Marsada
 Paiksa
 Pandakan
 Punay (Poblacion)
 Tiptipon

Climate

Demographics

Economy

References

External links
Panglima Estino Profile at PhilAtlas.com
[ Philippine Standard Geographic Code]
Panglima Estino Profile at the DTI Cities and Municipalities Competitive Index
Philippine Census Information
Local Governance Performance Management System

Municipalities of Sulu
Establishments by Philippine presidential decree